Hypotia dinteri is a species of snout moth in the genus Hypotia. It was described by Karl Grünberg in 1910 and is known from Namibia.

References

Endemic fauna of Namibia
Taxa named by Karl Grünberg
Moths described in 1910
Hypotiini
Insects of Namibia
Moths of Africa